William Harpin Mellor (June 6, 1874 – November 5, 1940) was a Major League Baseball first baseman. In 10 career games, he had 13 hits in 36 at-bats, with 5 RBIs. He batted and threw right-handed. Mellor attended both Brown University and the University of Virginia.

Mellor was born in Camden, New Jersey and died in Bridgeton, Rhode Island.  He served as the head baseball coach at Connecticut Agricultural College—now known as the University of Connecticut—for one season, in 1920.

References

External links
 

1874 births
1940 deaths
Major League Baseball first basemen
Baltimore Orioles (1901–02) players
Atlanta Crackers players
Beaumont Oilers players
Brown Bears baseball coaches
Brown Bears baseball players
Columbus Senators players
UConn Huskies baseball coaches
Pawtucket Maroons players
Pawtucket Phenoms players
Sportspeople from Camden, New Jersey
Baseball players from Camden, New Jersey